Deana Uppal (born 30 January 1989)  is an English beauty pageant titleholder, actress and business entrepreneur. She was the winner of Miss India UK 2012. She was also one of the housemates in the Big Brother (British series 13), one of the contestants in Fear Factor, Khatron ke Khiladi 5, and has featured in various movies. Uppal currently runs a number of businesses under DKU World. Uppal is the founder of DKU Kindness Diaries charitable trust. Deana's latest documentary, which she directed, produced and hosted, is currently being shown on channels worldwide.

Personal life
Uppal was born in Middlesbrough. Her father died from cancer when she was a child, and she moved to the Midlands when she was 12. Deana currently lives between London and India.

Big Brother 13

Uppal participated in Big Brother 13 in 2012.

On Day 1, Uppal entered the house along with fifteen other housemates. She was randomly selected by Big Brother to be the first housemate to enter the house, and had to nominate three of the other housemates in front of her in exchange for immunity from the public eviction. On Day 70, Uppal left the house in 3rd place. She received the most nominations of the entire series and survived the highest number of evictions.

Filmography

References
PTC - http://www.ptcpunjabi.co.in/hard-kaur-will-be-a-strong-launch-for-deana-uppal-in-punjabi-film-industry/

Indian beauty pageant winners
Big Brother (British TV series) contestants
British people of Indian descent
1989 births
Living people
People from Middlesbrough
Bigg Boss contestants
Fear Factor: Khatron Ke Khiladi participants